Chollangi Peta or Chollangipeta is name of a place in Andhra Pradesh:

 Chollangi Peta, East Godavari
 Chollangipeta, Vizianagaram